Yuri Aleksandrovich Garin (born 9 August 1958) is a former Russian football player.

External links
 

1958 births
People from Borisoglebsk
Living people
Soviet footballers
Russian footballers
PFC Krylia Sovetov Samara players
FC APK Morozovsk players
Russian Premier League players
FC Kuban Krasnodar players
Association football defenders
FC Dynamo Bryansk players
Sportspeople from Voronezh Oblast